Abigail Ashley is a Ghanaian television presenter, radio host, health advocate and the project leader for Behind My Smiles Foundation - a non-governmental organization (NGO) focusing on kidney health. She is also the author of the book "A Decade of My Life" Behind My Smiles.

Ashley is the presenter and host for "My Health, My Life" on United Television Ghana. In 2017 she was nominated for "50 Young Most Influential people in Ghana".

Personal life 
She was diagnosed and survived chronic kidney disease stage after she was given 5years to live. She underwent a surgery for a kidney transplant.

Awards 
She was honored at the 9th Edition of the 3G Awards in Bronx in New York in the USA. She was awarded for her contributions towards individuals and her campaigns on living healthy lives.

References

Ghanaian television presenters
Ghanaian women television presenters
Ghanaian health activists
Living people
Year of birth missing (living people)